Steffan O'Sullivan is the author of several role-playing game books.

Career
Steffan O'Sullivan was a GURPS writer whose projects included GURPS Swashbucklers (1990) and GURPS Bunnies & Burrows (1992). He designed the FUDGE role-playing game system, first releasing it for free on the internet on December 7, 1993.  His friend Ann Dupuis was interested in starting her own game company, and using FUDGE as her flagship game; O'Sullivan agreed, provided the game remain free and available on the internet, so Dupuis created Wild Mule Games and released a limited print edition of FUDGE in 1994. Dupuis changed the company's name to Grey Ghost Press in 1995, and convinced O'Sullivan to work up a new ruleset for FUDGE, released to the internet in June 1995, and published later that year as the first large-scale FUDGE release from Grey Ghost Press. O'Sullivan changed the name from FUDGE to Fudge in 2000, and officially transferred the rights to the game to Grey Ghost Press in March 2004. O'Sullivan wrote the Princess Bride role-playing game using the FUDGE system, which was published by Toy Vault in 2019.

Among his works are the GURPS system books Bestiary, Bunnies & Burrows, Fantasy Bestiary and Swashbucklers. He is also the collaborative author of the Fudge open gaming system and the Sherpa game. 

He currently lives in New Hampshire.

References

External links
 Steffan O'Sullivan's home page
 Steffan O'Sullivan on the Steve Jackson games page

GURPS writers
Living people
Role-playing game designers
Year of birth missing (living people)